Ian McClure (born 23 August 1973) is an indoor and lawn bowler.

Profile
Ian McClure is from Coleraine and began playing bowls in 1988 after being introduced to the sport by his father and the ex-international Willie Murray.

Career

Commonwealth Games
McClure was part of the fours team that secured the gold medal for Northern Ireland at the 1998 Commonwealth Games in Kuala Lumpur, Malaysia, the other members were Gary McCloy, Martin McHugh and Neil Booth. Previously he had won a fours bronze in the 1994 Commonwealth Games. McClure was selected as part of the Northern Ireland team for the 2018 Commonwealth Games on the Gold Coast in Queensland.

In 2022, he competed in the men's triples and the men's fours at the 2022 Commonwealth Games. In the fours the team of McClure, Sam Barkley, Adam McKeown, Ian McClure and Martin McHugh won the gold medal defeating India in the final.

World Championships
McClure has won four medals at the World Championships; a triples bronze in the 2000 World Outdoor Bowls Championship and a fours bronze in the 2012 World Outdoor Bowls Championship. He won a silver medal for the combined Irish team with bowls pairs partner Gary Kelly in the pairs at the 2016 World Outdoor Bowls Championship and a fours bronze medal with Martin McHugh, Simon Martin and Neil Mulholland. In 2020 he was selected for the 2020 World Outdoor Bowls Championship in Australia.

National
McClure is a two time singles winner of the Irish National Bowls Championships (2008 & 2012) and subsequently won the singles at the British Isles Bowls Championships in 2013. In 2022, just one month after winning Commonwealth Games gold he won his sixth national title when winning the triples at the Irish National Bowls Championships.

Other
In 2011, he won the pairs and fours silver medals at the Atlantic Bowls Championships and in 2015 he won the pairs gold medal and the fours bronze medal at the Atlantic Bowls Championships.

References

External links
 
 
 
 

1973 births
Living people
Male lawn bowls players from Northern Ireland
Indoor Bowls World Champions
Commonwealth Games medallists in lawn bowls
Commonwealth Games gold medallists for Northern Ireland
Commonwealth Games bronze medallists for Northern Ireland
Bowls players at the 1994 Commonwealth Games
Bowls players at the 1998 Commonwealth Games
Bowls players at the 2010 Commonwealth Games
Bowls players at the 2014 Commonwealth Games
Bowls players at the 2018 Commonwealth Games
Bowls players at the 2022 Commonwealth Games
Medallists at the 1994 Commonwealth Games
Medallists at the 1998 Commonwealth Games
Medallists at the 2022 Commonwealth Games